The 1998–99 Czech Extraliga season was the sixth season of the Czech Extraliga since its creation after the breakup of Czechoslovakia and the Czechoslovak First Ice Hockey League in 1993.

Standings

Playoffs

Quarterfinal
 HC Slovnaft Vsetín - HC Vítkovice 4:3 SN (0:2,2:1,1:0,0:0)
 HC Slovnaft Vsetín - HC Vítkovice 3:1 (0:0,3:1,0:0)
 HC Vítkovice - HC Slovnaft Vsetín 4:2 (1:0,2:1,1:1)
 HC Vítkovice - HC Slovnaft Vsetín 1:3 (0:0,1:1,0:2)
 HC Sparta Praha - HC České Budějovice4:3 SN (1:1,2:0,0:2,0:0)
 HC Sparta Praha - HC České Budějovice 2:0 (0:0,1:0,1:0)
 HC České Budějovice - HC Sparta Praha 1:3 (0:1,0:2,1:0)
 HC ZPS Barum Zlín - HC IPB Pojišťovna Pardubice 1:0 (0:0,1:0,0:0)
 HC ZPS Barum Zlín - HC IPB Pojišťovna Pardubice 2:0 (0:0,1:0,1:0)
 HC IPB Pojišťovna Pardubice - HC ZPS Barum Zlín 1:2 PP (0:1,1:0,0:0,0:1)
 HC Železárny Třinec - HC Keramika Plzeň 2:4 (1:0,1:2,0:2)
 HC Železárny Třinec - HC Keramika Plzeň 4:2 (0:1,3:1,1:0)
 HC Keramika Plzeň - HC Železárny Třinec 3:2 (1:1,1:1,1:0)
 HC Keramika Plzeň - HC Železárny Třinec 3:6 (3:4,0:1,0:1)
 HC Železárny Třinec - HC Keramika Plzeň 4:1 (1:0,1:1,2:0)

Semifinal
 HC Slovnaft Vsetín - HC Sparta Praha 2:1 PP (1:0,0:1,0:0,1:0)
 HC Slovnaft Vsetín - HC Sparta Praha 2:3 (1:1,0:0,1:2)
 HC Sparta Praha - HC Slovnaft Vsetín 2:4 (1:2,1:1,0:1)
 HC Sparta Praha - HC Slovnaft Vsetín 4:1 (1:0,2:1,1:0)
 HC Slovnaft Vsetín - HC Sparta Praha 1:0 SN (0:0,0:0,0:0,0:0)
 HC ZPS Barum Zlín - HC Železárny Třinec 5:1 (2:0,2:1,1:0)
 HC ZPS Barum Zlín - HC Železárny Třinec 2:1 (1:1,0:0,1:0)
 HC Železárny Třinec - HC ZPS Barum Zlín 5:1 (1:1,2:0,2:0)
 HC Železárny Třinec - HC ZPS Barum Zlín 5:4 (1:2,1:2,3:0)
 HC ZPS Barum Zlín - HC Železárny Třinec 3:2 (2:1,0:0,1:1)

Final
HC Vsetin - HC Zlin 3-1, 4-3, 4-2

HC Vsetin is Czech champion for 1998-99.

Relegation
 HC Dukla Jihlava - HC Znojemští Orli 3:4 
 HC Dukla Jihlava - HC Znojemští Orli 1:6 (1:2,0:2,0:2)
 HC Dukla Jihlava - HC Znojemští Orli 2:3 PP (1:1,1:1,0:0,0:1)
 HC Znojemští Orli - HC Dukla Jihlava 4:1 (1:1,3:0,0:0)
 HC Znojemští Orli - HC Dukla Jihlava 2:3 PP (0:0,2:0,0:2,0:1)
 HC Dukla Jihlava - HC Znojemští Orli 8:2 (1:0,3:0,4:2)
 HC Znojemští Orli - HC Dukla Jihlava 1:3 (0:0,1:2,0:1)
 HC Dukla Jihlava - HC Znojemští Orli 2:3 (0:0,0:2,2:1)

External links 
 

Czech Extraliga seasons
1998–99 in Czech ice hockey
Czech